1TYM (Korean: 원타임, pronounced as "One Time") was a four-member South Korean group. They were Teddy Park (also known as Park Hong-jun), Oh Jinhwan, Song Baekyoung, and Danny Im (also known as Im Taebin).

History 
In the late 1990s, YG CEO Yang Hyun Suk had his trainees perform as a group named MF family which was named after an apparel brand called Majah Flavah! created by  Sean of the Korean hiphop group Jinusean. The group initially had seven members, which three of them later departed. They originally participated in the song "No more(이제 더 이상)"in the album "The Real" by Jinusean as a featured artist in January 1998.

Teddy and Danny grew up in Los Angeles and were discovered there when they were teenagers by a producer who worked with Yang Hyun-suk. After auditioning for Yang, the two were signed to his new label, YG Entertainment, and moved to South Korea. Teddy, Danny, and rappers Jinhwan and Baekyoung debuted as 1TYM in 1998 with the album, One Time for Your Mind. It was one of the best-selling albums of the year and won several major awards.

Hiatus
1TYM went on hiatus in 2006 due to Oh's mandatory military service. Although they never officially disbanded they have not been active as a group since then. Their last performance was in 2008, when they were guests for BIGBANG's Japan Concert "Stand Up".

Oh and Song both left the entertainment industry and have since married and started their own families. Song most recently made an appearance on Radio Star alongside fellow first-generation K-pop idol singers Joon Park and Kim Tae-woo of g.o.d and Jun Jin of Shinhwa. He stated that he and Oh were business partners and run a restaurant together.

Members
 Teddy – rap, leader
 Oh Jin-hwan – rap
 Song Baek-kyoung – rap
 Danny – vocals

Discography

Studio albums

Music videos

Awards

KMTV Music Awards

Golden Disk Awards

SBS Music Awards

References

External links
  (in Korean)

YG Entertainment artists
South Korean boy bands
South Korean hip hop groups
K-pop music groups
Musical groups from Seoul
Musical groups established in 1998